is a train station in Kushima, Miyazaki Prefecture, Japan.

Lines

Layout 
The station consists of a side platform serving a single track at grade. The station building is a simple wooden structure with a tiled roof. It is unstaffed and serves only as a waiting room. After the ticket gate, short flight of steps leads up to the platform.

Adjacent stations

History
Japanese National Railways (JNR) opened Fukushima-Takamatsu on 15 September 1949 as an temporary stop on the existing track of its then Shibushi Line. On 10 January 1950, it was upgraded to a full station. On 8 May 1963, the route was designated the Nichinan Line. With the privatization of JNR on 1 April 1987, the station came under the control of JR Kyushu.

Passenger statistics
In fiscal 2016, the station was used by an average of 2 passengers (boarding only) per day.

See also
List of railway stations in Japan

References

External links
Fukushima-Takamatsu (JR Kyushu)

Railway stations in Miyazaki Prefecture
Railway stations in Japan opened in 1949